Ngbundu is a minor Ubangian language (Banda) of the Democratic Republic of the Congo.

References

Languages of the Democratic Republic of the Congo
Banda languages